Reuben Fletcher Booth (June 7, 1878 – March 15, 1953) was an American football and baseball player and coach. He served as the ninth head football coach at Kansas State Agricultural College, now Kansas State University, holding the position for one season in 1904 and compiling a record of 1–6.

Booth attended high school in Evanston, Illinois, and graduated from Northwestern University in 1903 with a degree in mathematics. He played third base for Northwestern's baseball team, and lettered for the football team at Northwestern in 1901 and 1902.

After graduation, Booth moved to Kansas State in Manhattan, Kansas, to work as an assistant in the mathematics department. He coached the football team during the 1904 season. Booth also reportedly coached the Kansas State baseball team in 1905.

In 1906–07, Booth attended graduate school at the University of Chicago, and was at Purdue University the following year. He later settled permanently in Olathe, Kansas.

Head coaching record

References

1878 births
1953 deaths
Baseball third basemen
Kansas State Wildcats baseball coaches
Kansas State Wildcats football coaches
Kansas State University faculty
Northwestern Wildcats baseball players
Northwestern Wildcats football players
Purdue University alumni
University of Chicago alumni
Sportspeople from Evanston, Illinois
Coaches of American football from Illinois
Players of American football from Illinois
Baseball coaches from Illinois
Baseball players from Illinois